Lodovico Cardi (21 September 1559 – 8 June 1613), also known as Cigoli, was an Italian painter and architect of the late Mannerist and early Baroque period, trained and active in his early career in Florence, and spending the last nine years of his life in Rome.

Biography
Lodovico Cardi was born at Villa Castelvecchio in Cigoli, Tuscany, whence the name by which he is commonly known. Initially, Cigoli trained in Florence under the fervid mannerist Alessandro Allori, and studied the works of Michelangelo, Correggio, Andrea del Sarto and Pontormo. Later, influenced by the most prominent of the "Counter-Maniera" painters, Santi di Tito, as well as by Barocci, Cigoli shed the shackles of mannerism and infused his later paintings with an expressionism often lacking from 16th-century Florentine painting.

For the Roman patron, Massimo Massimi, he painted an Ecce Homo (now in Palazzo Pitti). Supposedly unbeknownst to any of the painters, two other prominent contemporary painters, Passignano and Caravaggio, had been requested canvases on the same theme. This work was afterwards taken by Napoleon to the Louvre, and was restored to Florence in 1815.

One of his early paintings was of Cain slaying Abel. He then gained the employ of the  Grand-Duke in some works for the
Pitti Palace, where he painted a Venus and Satyr and a Sacrifice of Isaac.

Other important pictures are St. Peter Healing the Lame Man in St Peter's; an unfinished Burial of St. Paul in the church of San Paolo fuori le Mura, and a Story of Psyche in a fresco incorporated in the decorative scheme of the Villa Borghese; a Martyrdom of Stephen, which earned him the name of the "Florentine Correggio", and a Stigmata of St. Francis at Florence. Shortly before his death, Cigoli was made a Knight of Malta at the request of Pope Paul V.

As stated by the prominent 17th-century painter, Andrea Sacchi, Cigoli's, St Peter Healing the Lame Man came to be recognized as the third most beautiful painting in Rome after Raphael's Transfiguration and Domenichino's The Last Communion of St Jerome. Cigoli's fame and influence, even prior to coming to Rome, was of such a degree that the Florentine ambassador to the city greeted the artist on his arrival to the Eternal City. In Baldanucci's Notizie or lives of the artists, Cigoli is the only artist, along with Michelangelo, given the unique title of "Divine".

Cigoli, a close personal friend of Galileo Galilei – and regarded by him as the greatest painter of the age – painted a last fresco in the dome of the Pauline chapel of the church of Santa Maria Maggiore in Rome, depicting the Madonna standing upon a pock-marked lunar orb. This is the first extant example of Galileo's discoveries about the physical nature of the Moon (as he himself drew it in his 1610 treatise Sidereus Nuncius) having penetrated the visual arts practice of his day. Until this image, the Moon in pictures of the Virgin had always been mythical and smooth, perfectly spherical as described by Platonic & Ptolemaic tradition.

His pupils include Cristofano Allori (1577–1621), the Fleming Giovanni Biliverti (1576–1644), Domenico Fetti, Giovanni Antonio Lelli, Aurelio Lomi, Pietro Medici, Gregorio Pagani, and Andrea Comodi (1560–1638).

References

Sources

External links

 Orazio and Artemisia Gentileschi, a fully digitized exhibition catalog from The Metropolitan Museum of Art Libraries, which contains material on Cigoli (see index)

1559 births
1613 deaths
People from the Province of Pisa
16th-century Italian painters
Italian male painters
17th-century Italian painters
Painters from Tuscany
Italian Mannerist painters
Italian Mannerist architects